Arthur Edward Cummins (19 August 1876 – 5 December 1911) was an Australian rules footballer who played for the Carlton Football Club in the Victorian Football League (VFL). He has the unique record of his entire career consisting of seven consecutive matches against seven different opponents at seven different venues.

Notes

External links 

	
Arthur Cummins's profile at Blueseum

1876 births
Australian rules footballers from Victoria (Australia)
Carlton Football Club players
1911 deaths
Castlemaine Football Club players